Richard Dennis (born 1949) is an American commodities trader.

Richard Dennis may also refer to:

 Richard Dennis (footballer) (born 1966), Australian rules footballer
 Richard Dennis (Medal of Honor) (1826–?), American Civil War sailor
 Richard Harry Dennis (1897–1972), English police officer and detective
 Ricky Dennis, American motorsports businessman
 Richard William George Dennis (1910–2003), English botanist

See also 
 Richard Denniss, Australian economist, author and public policy commentator
 Richard Denys, English MP for Bath and Gloucestershire